The 2016 Southern Conference men's soccer tournament, was the 11th edition of the tournament. It determined the Southern Conference's automatic berth into the 2016 NCAA Division I Men's Soccer Championship.

The Mercer Bears won the SoCon title, besting the East Tennessee State Buccaneers, 4–1 in penalty kicks following a scoreless match. It was Mercer's first SoCon title.

The tournament was hosted by the University of North Carolina Greensboro and all matches were contested at UNCG Soccer Stadium.

Seeding

Bracket

See also 
2016 Southern Conference men's soccer season
2016 NCAA Division I men's soccer season
2016 NCAA Division I Men's Soccer Championship
Southern Conference Men's Soccer Tournament

References

External links 
2016 SoCon Tournament Central

Southern Conference Men's Soccer
Southern Conference Men's Soccer Tournament